Sink the Belgrano! is a 1986 satirical play in verse written by English playwright Steven Berkoff. It premiered at the Half Moon Theatre on 2 September 1986.

The play is about British Prime Minister Margaret Thatcher's decision to torpedo the Argentinian ship General Belgrano, as it was purportedly retreating during the 1982 Falklands War between the United Kingdom and Argentina.

According to the British Council, Sink the Belgrano is among Berkoff's "lesser-known works".

Characters
Maggot Scratcher (parody of Margaret Thatcher)
Pimp (parody of Francis Pym)
Nit (parody of John Nott)
Chorus
Command
Tell
Woody (parody of Sandy Woodward)
Tommy
President of Argentina
Feet
Sir Fish Face
Reason
Sailors
Farmers

Initial critical reception
According to Berkoff the play received "mixed-reviews and some virulent ones from the right-wing press. It was curious that their reviews, which were almost hysterical cant, resembled so closely the threats and poisoned mail I received from Fascist thugs." Berkoff also states that The Observer "refused to even review it" which he saw as "people refusing to review a point of view that differed from government's kind of status quo attitude that [they] were the heroes". Because of this Berkoff described The Observer'''s actions as that of "stinking, spineless cowards" and speculated that "maybe there was a government order [saying] don't review it". Berkoff has also said that the production originally had "one or two good reviews" and he felt that with more critical support the play would have transferred to the West End. However, this did not happen with Berkoff saying that "eventually the press they killed us. By not supporting us."

Notes

References
"East and More Verse Plays" .  Steven Berkoff: Plays.  Accessed 30 Sept. 2008.
Hagan, Kenneth J.  "Sink the Belgrano!" The New York Times 14 June 1992, Arts.  (Book review of One Hundred Days: The Memoirs of the Falklands Battle Group Commander'', by Adm. Sandy Woodward with Patrick Robinson. Fwd. Margaret Thatcher. Annapolis, MD: Naval Institute Press, 1992.  New York: HarperCollins, 1992. .)

External links
Sink the Belgrano! webpage on the Half Moon Stages website 
Steven Berkoff – Official Website.

Plays by Steven Berkoff
1986 plays
Falklands War